Kromdraai Conservancy is a protected conservation park located to the south-west of Gauteng province in north-east South Africa.  It is in the Muldersdrift area not far from Krugersdorp.

Etymology
Its name is derived from Afrikaans meaning "Crooked Turn" after a kink in the meandering Crocodile River.

History
It was established to protect the caves, old gold mines, fossil sites, trout farm and a game reserve in the area.  The caves in the area, known as the Sterkfontein caves have an extensive number of fossils and dolomite caverns. A well known fossil site is also named Kromdraai and it, along with such sites as Sterkfontein, Coopers, Swartkrans and Plovers Lake form part of the conservancy. Part of the Kromdraai conservancy also falls within the Cradle of Humankind World Heritage Site, proclaimed by UNESCO in 1998.

Places of interest

 Wonder Cave
 Sterkfontein

See also
 Kromdraai, Limpopo
 Rhino and Lion Nature Reserve, Kromdraai

References

External links
 Official Website of the Cradle of Humankind

Protected areas of Gauteng
Mogale City Local Municipality